The 2022–23 Nemzeti Bajnokság III is Hungary's third-level football competition.

Teams
The following teams have changed division since the 2022–23 season.

Team changes

To NB III

From NB III

Standings

Eastern group

Central group

Western group

See also
 2022–23 Magyar Kupa
 2022–23 Nemzeti Bajnokság I
 2022–23 Nemzeti Bajnokság II
 2022–23 Megyei Bajnokság I

References

External links
  
  

Nemzeti Bajnokság III seasons
2022–23 in Hungarian football
Hun